James Allison Jr. (October 4, 1772June 17, 1854) was an American lawyer and politician who served as a member of the U.S. House of Representatives from Pennsylvania, serving two terms from 1823 to 1825.

Biography
James Allison Jr. (father of John Allison) was born near Elkton, Maryland. He moved with his parents to Washington County, Pennsylvania, in 1774. At seventeen years of age, he enrolled in the school of David Johnson of Beaver, Pennsylvania. 

He saw service in the Indian warfare at Yellow Creek. He studied law, was admitted to the bar in 1796, and commenced practice in Washington, Pennsylvania. He returned to Beaver in 1803 and continued the practice of law until 1822, when he was elected to Congress. He served as prosecuting attorney of Beaver County, Pennsylvania, from 1803 to 1809.

Congress 
Allison was elected as a Jackson Republican to the Eighteenth and a Jacksonian to the Nineteenth Congresses and served until his resignation on August 26, 1825 before the assembling of the Nineteenth Congress.

Later career and death 
He resumed the practice of law until 1848, after which he discontinued active pursuits and lived in retirement until his death in Beaver in 1854.  He was interred in Old Cemetery.

References

The Political Graveyard

Pennsylvania lawyers
1772 births
1854 deaths
Democratic-Republican Party members of the United States House of Representatives from Pennsylvania
Jacksonian members of the United States House of Representatives from Pennsylvania
19th-century American politicians
People from Elkton, Maryland